Solo was a Swedish language monthly women's magazine published in Stockholm, Sweden. The magazine was in circulation between 1997 and 2016.

History and profile
Solo was founded in 1997. The magazine targeted young women between 18 and 35 years old. It was part of Aller media. Karin Nordin was the editor-in-chief of the magazine which was published on a monthly basis. Its headquarters was in Stockholm. In Spring 2016 the frequency of the magazine was made bimonthly. In Fall of the same year the magazine folded.

References

1997 establishments in Sweden
2016 disestablishments in Sweden
Bi-monthly magazines published in Sweden
Defunct magazines published in Sweden
Magazines established in 1997
Magazines disestablished in 2016
Magazines published in Stockholm
Monthly magazines published in Sweden
Swedish-language magazines
Women's magazines published in Sweden